Anthela linearis is a moth of the family Anthelidae first described by Thomas Pennington Lucas in 1891. It is found in Australia.

References

Moths described in 1891
Anthelidae